"Bronco" Billy Wright (born December 10, 1964) is an American former professional boxer who fought in the Heavyweight division. Throughout his pro career he scored 29 first round knockouts. He was a sparring partner for George Foreman in his championship fight with then undefeated heavyweight world champion Michael Moorer.

References

External links
 
 

|-

1964 births
Living people
American male boxers
Heavyweight boxers
People from Morenci, Arizona